Interior of a Romanesque Church is an oil on mahoganey painting by J. M. W. Turner, painted c. 1795–1800. It depicts the interior of a Medieval church in the romanesque style. It is held at the Tate Gallery, in London.

References

1790s paintings
Paintings by J. M. W. Turner
Churches in art
Collection of the Tate galleries